Mario Aníbal Sandoval Toro (born 24 July 1991) is a Chilean professional footballer who plays as a midfielder for Curicó Unido in the Chilean Primera División.

Personal life
He is the cousin of the Chile international footballer Charles Aránguiz. In addition, his aunt and mother of Charles, Mariana, is a football coach at amateur level in Puente Alto, Santiago.

References

External links
 
 

1991 births
Living people
footballers from Santiago
Chilean footballers
Association football midfielders
Chilean Primera División players
Primera B de Chile players
Segunda División Profesional de Chile players
Colo-Colo footballers
Puerto Montt footballers
Colo-Colo B footballers
San Marcos de Arica footballers
Deportes Copiapó footballers
Deportes Melipilla footballers
Santiago Morning footballers
San Antonio Unido footballers
Unión Española footballers
Universidad de Chile footballers
Curicó Unido footballers